Michael Gillett (born 10 April 1973) is a former professional rugby league footballer who played in the 1990s and 2000s.  Gillett played for the London Broncos in the Super League and also for the Wests Tigers, the Balmain Tigers and the Penrith Panthers in Australia.

Background
Gillett was born in Wentworthville, New South Wales, Australia.

Playing career
Gillett made his first grade debut for Penrith in Round 7 of the 1993 season against Cronulla.   In 1994, Gillett joined Balmain and in his first season at the club they finished last on the table claiming the wooden spoon.

In 1995, Balmain re-branded themselves as the "Sydney Tigers" and moved their home games to Parramatta Stadium.  The name change along with the move happened during the height of the super league war.  In 1997, Balmain ditched the "Sydney Tigers" idea and returned to using Balmain as the name of the club and began playing at Leichhardt Oval again.  

Gillett played with Balmain until the end of 1999, after which they merged with Western Suburbs to form the Wests Tigers.  Gillett was one of the few players signed on from Balmain for the following season to play for the new club.  Gillett played 1 season with Wests Tigers before signing with English club the London Broncos.  Gillett spent 2 seasons with London before retiring from rugby league at the end of 2002.

References

External links
London Broncos profile
 SL stats
 Rugby League Project stats

1973 births
Living people
Australian rugby league players
Balmain Tigers players
Wests Tigers players
London Broncos players
Penrith Panthers players
Rugby league players from Sydney